Olga Govortsova and Tatiana Poutchek were the defending champions, but they chose to not compete this year.
Edina Gallovits and Sania Mirza won this tournament. They defeated Han Xinyun and Liu Wan-ting 7–5, 6–3 in the final.

Seeds

Draw

References
 Doubles Draw

Guangzhou International Women's Open - Doubles
Guangzhou International Women's Open